Adrianos Perdikaris Vourliotakis (Greek: Αδριανός Περδικάρης; born October 24, 1991 in Athens, Greece) is a Greek basketball player. He is 6'9' (2.05) tall Power forward.

Professional career
Perdikaris start his professional career with Ilysiakos in 2014. In 2015 he signed with Lavrio.

On October 5, 2018, he joined Ethnikos Piraeus of the Greek 2nd Division.

References

External links
Eurobasket.com Profile
RealGM.com Profile
Franklin Pierce College Profile

1991 births
Living people
Doukas B.C. players
Franklin Pierce Ravens men's basketball players
Greek Basket League players
Greek expatriate basketball people in the United States
Greek men's basketball players
Ilysiakos B.C. players
Power forwards (basketball)
Psychiko B.C. players
Basketball players from Athens